The final of the Men's hammer throw event at the 2002 European Championships in Munich, Germany was held on August 7, 2002. There were a total number of 31 participating athletes. The qualifying rounds were staged a day earlier, on August 6, with the mark set in 79.00 metres.

Medalists

Abbreviations
All results shown are in metres

Records

Qualification

Group A

Group B

Final

See also
 2000 Men's Olympic Hammer Throw (Sydney)
 2001 Men's World Championships Hammer Throw (Edmonton)
 2002 Hammer Throw Year Ranking
 2003 Men's World Championships Hammer Throw (Paris)
 2004 Men's Olympic Hammer Throw (Athens)

References
 Results
 todor66
 athletix
 hammerthrow.wz

Hammer throw
Hammer throw at the European Athletics Championships